The Toronto Attack are a Canadian junior ice hockey team.

Toronto attack or attack on Toronto may also refer to:

Attacks
 Toronto van attack (2018), vehicle-ramming attack
 Litton Industries bombing (1982)

Attempted attacks
 1991 Toronto bomb plot
 2006 Ontario terrorism plot

See also
 Battle of Montgomery's Tavern (1837), part of the Upper Canada Rebellion
 Battle of York (1813), part of the War of 1812
 Toronto shooting (disambiguation)